Alexander Lindsay, 2nd Lord Spynie (died March 1646) was a Scottish nobleman and soldier of fortune.

Life
He was the eldest son of Alexander Lindsay, 1st Lord Spynie, by his wife Jean Lyon, and was still a minor at the time of his father's murder in 1607. When, in 1609, the trial of his father's murderer was not proceeded with on account of the absence of a prosecutor, a protest was made on his behalf and that of the other infant children, that their ultimate right of prosecution should not be invalidated. Spynie, however, after he came of age, agreed to waive his right of prosecution, when Lindsay of Edzell, the murderer, affirmed on oath that the slaughter was accidental, and undertook to pay a sum of eight thousand merks, and make over to him and his sister the lands of Garlobank, Perthshire. Edzell, on 7 March 1617, obtained a remission for the slaughter under the great seal.

Spynie was one of the Scottish lords who attended the funeral of James VI and I in Westminster Abbey in 1625. On 2 June 1626 he was made commander-in-chief in Scotland for life. Having raised a regiment of three thousand foot for King Christian IV of Denmark-Norway, he served with distinction in both Denmark and Germany. Christian made him Governor General of the eastern Danish provinces of Skåne, Halland and Blekinge. In 1628 his regiment fought at the siege of Stralsund alongside the regiment of Donald Mackay, Lord Reay. The Scots and their allies in the garrison were eventually relieved by Sir Alexander Leslie who was made governor of the city. Lord Spynie and his regiment were thereafter recalled to Skåne while Mackay's were recalled to Copenhagen leaving Leslie and his troops in command of the city.

After his return to Scotland, his appointment as commander-in-chief was confirmed 28 June 1633.

In the dispute with the Covenanters, Spynie supported the king Charles I of Great Britain. He joined Montrose at Perth after the battle of Tippermuir in September 1644, and with him on the 14th entered Aberdeen, but when Montrose two days afterwards vacated the city he was taken prisoner, and sent south to Edinburgh.

Spynie died in March 1646.

Family
Spynie married first, Joanna Douglas, and secondly, Lady Margaret Hay, only daughter of George Hay, 1st Earl of Kinnoull. By his first wife he had no issue, but by his second he had two sons—Alexander, master of Kinnoul, and George, who succeeded him as third lord—and two daughters: Margaret, married to William Fullarton of Fullarton, and Anne, who died unmarried.

Notes

Attribution

Year of birth missing
1646 deaths
Scottish feudal barons
Members of the Convention of the Estates of Scotland 1621
Lords of Parliament (pre-1707)
Scottish people of the Thirty Years' War